The 2020–21 Ardal SE season (also known as the 2020–21 Floodlighting and Electrical Services Ardal SE season for sponsorship reasons) was to be the first season of the new third-tier southern region football in Welsh football pyramid, part of the Ardal Leagues.  Teams were to play each other twice on a home and away basis.

Due to the COVID-19 pandemic in Wales, the Football Association of Wales cancelled the 2020–21 seasons of the Ardal Leagues and below.

Teams
Normally, the league is made up of 16 teams competing for one automatic promotion place to Cymru South, whilst the second place team goes into a play-off with the second place team of Ardal SW.  Three teams are relegated to tier 4.

Team changes

To Ardal SE
From Mid Wales Football League Division 1
 Llandrindod Wells

Promoted from Mid Wales Football League Division 2
 Rhayader Town

From Welsh Football League Division One
 Goytre
 Caldicot Town
 Abergavenny Town
 Aberbargoed Buds
 Monmouth Town
 Croesyceiliog

From Welsh Football League Division Two
 Trethomas Bluebirds
 Abertillery Bluebirds
 Newport City
 Chepstow Town
 Tredegar Town
 Treowen Stars
 Panteg

From Gwent County League Premier Division
 Abertillery Excelsiors

Stadia and locations

Source: Ardal SW Ground Information

Season overview
On 28 July 2020, The Football Association of Wales announced that this league would be named Ardal SW and would be sponsored by Floodlighting and Electrical Services.  Ardal SE & Ardal SW divisions will make up the Ardal Southern region of tier 3 in the men's Welsh domestic game.

Since anti-COVID-19 restrictions were put in place by FAW, clubs could have trained in groups of 15 and contact training was allowed at all levels of football.  However, competitive and exhibition matches were still not allowed to take place.

League table

Results

References

External links
Football Association of Wales
Ardal Southern Leagues
Ardal Southern Twitter Page
Tier 3 Rules & Regulations

2020–21 in Welsh football
Ardal Leagues
Wales